The Landskrone in the borough of Bad Neuenahr-Ahrweiler in the German state of  Rhineland-Palatinate is a hill, in the Middle Rhine area. On the western hillside of the Landskrone is the Chapel of Our Lady of Perpetual Succour (Maria-Hilf-Kapelle) or St. Mary's Chapel (Marienkapelle).

Geography 
The Landskrone is part of the northern foothills of the lower Ahr Valley. It lies east of Bad Neuenahr between Gimmigen in the north-northwest and Heppingen in the west, Heimersheim in the south and Lohrsdorf in the east, all belonging to the borough of Bad Neuenahr-Ahrweiler. To the south the River Ahr flows past from east to west, which is joined by the Leimersdorfer Bach (Heppinger Bach) to the southwest and to the Lohrsdorfer Bach to the east-southeast.

References 

Mountains and hills of Rhineland-Palatinate
Nature reserves in Rhineland-Palatinate
Mountains and hills of the Eifel
Ahrweiler (district)